Krummwisch is a municipality in the district of Rendsburg-Eckernförde, in Schleswig-Holstein, Germany.

The location of Krummwisch is south of the municipality of Lindau or Schinkel, but north of Bredenbek or Felde, and east of Bovenau.

References

Municipalities in Schleswig-Holstein
Rendsburg-Eckernförde